The Graciosa State Park is a  state park in the state of Paraná, Brazil.
It protects an area of dense rainforest in the Atlantic Forest biome.

Location

The Graciosa State Park is in the municipality of Morretes, Paraná.
It is situated between the Serra da Graciosa and the Serra do Mar.
It is in the Atlantic Forest biome.
The park contains typical dense rainforest flora, and is home to a wide variety of species of birds, mammals, snakes, frogs and insects.
The park is located between Anhangava, Marumbi and Pico Paraná.
It receives few visitors due to the difficulty of finding a way through the dense forest, lack of mountain meadows and absence of important summits.
It adjoins the  Pico Paraná State Park to the north.
It is part of the Lagamar Mosaic.

History

The Graciosa State Park was created by decree 7.302 of 24 September 1990 by the governor of the state of Paraná.
The purpose was to protect the biodiversity and water sources of the region.
The park was created from the Farinha Seca property.
The state's Institute of Lands, Cartography and Forests (ITCF) was responsible for administration and for creating a management plan within two years, which would integrate the park into Marumbi's Special Area of Tourist Interest.
The park is classed as IUCN protected area category II (national park).

Notes

Sources

State parks of Brazil
Protected areas of Paraná (state)
1990 establishments in Brazil